Frederick Miller Lewis (October 13, 1858 – June 5, 1945) was a 19th-century professional baseball outfielder.  Lewis played for six seasons from 1881 to 1886 for the Boston Red Caps, Philadelphia Quakers, St. Louis Browns, St. Louis Maroons, and Cincinnati Red Stockings.

Life
Lewis was born on October 13, 1858, in Buffalo, New York. He died on June 5, 1945, in Utica, New York. He was buried at Forest Hill Cemetery in Utica.

References

External links

1858 births
1945 deaths
19th-century baseball players
Major League Baseball outfielders
Boston Red Caps players
Philadelphia Quakers players
St. Louis Browns (AA) players
St. Louis Maroons players
Cincinnati Red Stockings (AA) players
Baseball players from Buffalo, New York
Capital City of Albany players
Rochester Hop Bitters players
San Francisco Bay City players
Syracuse Stars (minor league baseball) players
Rochester Maroons players
Toronto Canucks players
American expatriate baseball players in Canada
Burials at Forest Hill Cemetery (Utica, New York)